Jumio is an online mobile payments and identity verification company that provides card and ID scanning and validation products for mobile and web transactions, which they sell as "Netverify Trusted Identity as a Service".

History
The company was founded in 2010 by Daniel Mattes, who was CEO until he resigned in April 2015 in conjunction with an internal board investigation.  In December 2015, Jumio informed its investors that financial results from 2013 and 2014 would be re-stated.

In March 2016, the company stated that "Certain legacy issues combined with related government investigations and proceedings have made it difficult for Jumio to secure necessary funding for its operations." As a result, it was entering Chapter 11 restructuring proceedings.

On May 6, 2016 Jumio was acquired by Centana Growth Partners, a private equity firm specializing in technology companies with a focus on financial services

References

Companies based in Palo Alto, California
Identity management systems
Mobile payments
American companies established in 2010
2010 establishments in California